Lieutenant-General Sir Arthur Edward Aveling Holland  (13 April 1862 – 7 December 1927) was a British Army officer and Conservative and Unionist politician.

Military career
Born the son of Major-General Butcher, Butcher changed his surname to Holland in 1910. Holland was commissioned into the Royal Artillery in 1880. He served in the Second Boer War and then became Assistant Military Secretary to the Governor and Commander-in-Chief of Malta in 1903 before holding a similar role at the War Office from 1910. In 1912 he was appointed Commandant of the Royal Military Academy, Woolwich. He also served in World War I becoming Commander Royal Artillery for 8th Division in which capacity he took part in the Battle of Neuve Chapelle in March 1915. In July 1915 he became Commander Royal Artillery for VII Corps and in September 1915 he was appointed General Officer Commanding 1st Division. He continued his war service as Commander Royal Artillery for 3rd Army from June 1916 and as General Officer Commanding I Corps from February 1917 before retiring in 1920.

Member of Parliament
He was Member of Parliament for Northampton from 1924 until his death in 1927. The consequent by-election for his seat was won by the Labour candidate Cecil Malone.

Family
Arthur Holland married Mary Kate Duval; they had one daughter. He died in 1927 and was interred in Greenwich Cemetery.

References

External links 
 

|-

|-

|-

1862 births
1927 deaths
British Army lieutenant generals
British Army generals of World War I
Commandants of the Royal Military Academy, Woolwich
Conservative Party (UK) MPs for English constituencies
UK MPs 1924–1929
Knights Commander of the Order of the Bath
Knights Commander of the Order of St Michael and St George
Companions of the Distinguished Service Order
Members of the Royal Victorian Order
Royal Artillery officers
Military personnel from Kent